Juerg Egger (born 1 January 1982) is a Swiss bobsledder who has competed since 2005. His best Bobsleigh World Cup finish was second in the four-man event at Cesana Pariol in January 2008.

Egger's best finish at the FIBT World Championships was eighth in the four-man event at St. Moritz in 2007.

References
 

1982 births
Living people
Swiss male bobsledders
Bobsledders at the 2014 Winter Olympics
Olympic bobsledders of Switzerland
21st-century Swiss people